Ezras Nashim is an all-female Orthodox Jewish volunteer EMT ambulance service established with the goal of preserving women's modesty in emergency medical situations, especially childbirth.

History
The group was formed after its request to add a female corps of EMT volunteers to the all-male Hatzalah organization, the long-standing Orthodox Jewish EMT service in New York City, was rejected. Hatzalah was the subject of controversy as articles in the New York Post  and JEMS Magazine criticize the organization for its discriminatory practice of not allowing women to join. The group of Orthodox women cited the need for modesty and sensitivity to the needs of fellow Orthodox women.

Rachel Freier worked on a project to buy an ambulance for the organization after having been initially approached about the idea for the organization in the summer of 2011. Freier initially provided advocacy services for the group, and took over the directorship of the organization in 2012.

Branches
 Borough Park
 Monsey
 Flatbush
 Five Towns
 Stern College for Women

NY State Licensing
Ezras Nashim was licensed by the New York State Department of Health in February 2013, though the volunteer corps respond in their own private vehicles as Ezras Nashim is still awaiting a license to operate a full ambulance service.
In October 2019, a public hearing was held over Ezras Nashim's ambulance license at The EMS Council (REMSCO) of NYC.

In November 2019, The Council did not approve the motion, a failure of either side to produce a majority of 14 votes to either pass the motion or deny it. Therefore, the case moved up to the NY State EMS Council for a Decision.

In July 2020, a hearing was held at The NY State Council (SEMSCO) in Albany,

In August 2020, the entire council overwhelmingly approved the ambulance application for Ezras Nashim in a 23-2 vote.

Media

Ezras Nashim was the subject of the 2018 documentary film 93Queen. The film follows Freier, as she runs for public office and creates the first all-female ambulance corps in the United States, negotiating her community initiative within the context of a male-dominated Hasidic community.

The director of the 93Queen documentary is Paula Eislet who first encountered the Ezras Nashim organization through Yiddish language news reports.

References

Ambulance services
Ambulance services in the United States
First aid organizations
Jewish medical organizations